The 1949 Arrow Air DC-3 crash was an aviation accident that occurred on December 7, 1949, near Benicia, California. The aircraft, a Douglas DC-3 operated by Arrow Air, was flying from Oakland, California to Sacramento with 9 occupants, when it crashed. The cause of the crash was never confirmed, but evidence pointed towards pilot error. Everyone on board were killed in the crash.

Accident summary
The flight departed from Burbank at 2:20 PM, bound for Oakland. In command was captain James Garnett, and the co-pilot Joseph Meade Dillon. The flight to Oakland was uneventful, and when it arrived, 10 passengers disembarked. The plane then departed from Oakland at 4:46 PM, and was scheduled to arrive at Sacramento 5:33. It was carrying 9 occupants, including 3 children. Among the passengers was the wife of George E. Batchelor, the founder of Arrow Air. There were reports of bad weather on the flight that night. After takeoff, the flight reached its cruising altitude of 4,000 feet. At 5:08 PM, the flight made a call with the radio station in Richmond, and was assigned to make radio contact with the radio navigation center in Fairfield, 15 minutes later. The call was never made however.

When the flight was reported missing, a search was launched to find the missing aircraft. It was found the next morning on a hillside north of Benicia. All the occupants were reported dead. It was discovered that the flight had descended to 800 feet when it was assigned to maintain 4,000. However, why it did so was never determined.

References

1949 in California
Aviation accidents and incidents in 1949
Accidents and incidents involving the Douglas DC-3
Aviation accidents and incidents in California